This is a list of votes held by major cities as part of a participatory budgeting process, where people living in the city are allowed to vote for a number of proposals, and the funded proposals are determined based on the votes. While not all participatory budgeting processes include a formal voting stage, it is a very common feature, particularly in Europe. The list includes votes held in major cities with a population of at least  and a total amount equivalent to at least  being voted on. To be included, the vote must be open to the whole public (rather than limited to a jury) and its results must be de facto binding on the government. The list also includes votes held by states, provinces, or countries, if they meet these criteria (this includes Portugal and some Australian states).

Many cities divide their available budget among city districts and allow each voter to vote only on proposals located in their district. In effect, these are several independent votes happening simultaneously, but in the list, these sub-elections are merged into one. Some cities additionally hold a vote about city-wide proposals, and some allow voters to vote in several or all districts.

Participatory budgeting processes typically go through several stages (usually including soliciting proposals, selecting proposals, voting on proposals, and implementation), and this can take several years. There are different conventions of which year to use in referring to a particular process (e.g. some cities use the year in which the vote occurs, and others the year in which project implementation starts). In the table, the year refers to the year of the last day on which voters can cast their votes.

The list includes a brief description of the voting systems employed in the vote. This includes a choice of ballot format specifying how voters can indicate their preferences. The table uses the following terms to describe common choices:
 knapsack votes (where voters can vote for any number of proposals, but the cost of the selected proposals must sum up to less than the available budget),
 k-approval (where voters can vote for up to k proposals; common choices for k are 1, 5, and 10),
 spreading points (where each voter has a number of votes (such as 10) that can be spread across proposals, but the same proposal can receive several votes; also known as cumulative voting), and
 ranking (where voters select up to k proposals and then rank them).

Cities then use a system to decide on the winning proposals. Typically, this is done by sorting proposals by the number of votes the proposal received, and then repeatedly selecting the proposals with the highest number until the available budget runs out. Some cities also impose additional constraints on the process (such as a maximum amount that can be spent in any single neighborhood, or a minimum amount that must be spent in a certain category of projects) or use a more complicated participatory budgeting algorithm.

See also 
 Participatory budgeting by country

Notes

References 

Participatory budgeting
Direct democracy
Voting
Lists of referendums